Noordoewer is a settlement in the ǁKaras Region of southern Namibia. Its name means 'North Bank' in Afrikaans, in reference to the north bank of the Orange River, on which it is located. The village lies opposite the South African town of Vioolsdrif, to which it is connected by the road bridge which forms the northern end of the South African N7 and the southern end of the Namibian B1.

Noordoewer is known for grape production and canoeing and is an important border post on a crucial transport route between the two countries. It is planned to upgrade its status to that of a town.

References

Populated places in the ǁKaras Region
Orange River
Namibia–South Africa border crossings